Long Island Shores is the second album by American singer-songwriter Mindy Smith, released in 2006. Produced by Mindy Smith, Lex Price and Steve Buckingham, the album was recorded at Omnisound Studios, The Doghouse, Studio 491 and Beat Hollow Studios.

Reviews

Smith’s second album has been given mixed but mainly positive reviews, with its expressive and warm, breathy vocals and themes of love, loss, spirituality and sense of home. It includes uplifting melodies and gentle ballads.

Track listing
All songs written by Mindy Smith except where noted.

"Out Loud" (Smith, Hillary Lindsey) – 3:28    
"Little Devil" – 3:56   
"Edge of Love" (Smith, Beth Nielsen Chapman) – 3:52   
"Please Stay"  – 3:00   
"Tennessee" – 3:33   
"I'm Not the Only One Asking" (Smith, Fred Wilhelm) – 3:07   
"What If the World Stops Turning" feat. Buddy Miller (John Scott Sherrill) – 3:39   
"You Just Forgot" (Dave Loggins, Dennis Robbins, Sherrill) – 3:25   
"You Know I Love You Baby" (Smith, Maia Sharp) – 3:41   
"Out of Control" – 4:01   
"Long Island Shores" – 3:10
"Peace of Mind" – 3:16
"All His Saints" – 3:05 *downloadable bonus track from Best Buy stores

Personnel

Mindy Smith - Vocals, Harmony Vocals, Acoustic Guitar, Piano
Eddie Bayers - Drums
Michael Rhodes - Bass
Buddy Miller - Electric Guitar, Vocals
Bryan Sutton - Acoustic Guitar, 12 String
Lex Price - Electric Guitar, Tenor Guitar, Mandolin
Reese Wynans - B-3, Wurlitzer
Dan Dugmore - Steel Guitar
Daniel Tashian - Tambourine, Bass, 12 String, Percussion, Piano, Harmony Vocals
Nick Buda - Drums
Jonathan Trebing - Acoustic Guitar
Tim Marks - Bass
Andrea Zonn - Viola
Roger Moutenot - Keyboards, Fognode, Steel Guitar, Drum Loop
Micol Davis - Tambourine
James Digiaralamo - Keyboards, Organ
David Henry - Cello
Kyle Andrews - MicroKorg

Production
Produced by: Mindy Smith, Lex Price and Steve Buckingham.
Additional production: Roger Moutenot on "Please Stay", "You Just Forgot", "Out of Control" and "Long Island Shores".
Production Assistant: Lesli Halingstad.
Recorded at: Omnisound Studios Nashville, The Doghouse Nashville, Studio 491 and Beat Hollow Studios.
Engineers: Neal Cappellino, Marshal Morgan, Casey Woods, Bill Warner, Roger Moutenot, Brian Siskind and Lex Price.
Assistant Engineers: Bob Ingison, Jason Blackburn and Chris Furbush
Digital Editing: Chip Matthews
Mixed by: Gary Paczosa at Minutiae
Assisted by: Brandon Bell and Joey Crawford
Photography and Art Direction: Traci Goudie

Notes

"Out Loud" and "Please Stay" were released as singles.
"Out Loud" was released with an official accompanying video.

References

Mindy Smith albums
2006 albums
Vanguard Records albums